Building services engineering is a professional engineering discipline that strives to achieve a safe and comfortable indoor environment whilst minimizing the environmental impact of a building.

Alternative titles are "building services engineering (BSE)"; also known as "MEP" (Mechanical, Electrical and Plumbing) engineering; "technical building services"; and "building engineering" or "facilities and services planning engineering". The term building services engineering is widely used in Commonwealth countries (incl. United Kingdom, Ireland, Canada and Australia), but in the United States of America, Asian countries Saudi Arabia and Pakistan, the MEP engineers are known as "services planners".

In some countries, a "building services engineer" is a Senior MEP engineer with experience in the installation of equipment in Buildings Construction, Building Maintenance, Management, integration of electrical, mechanical, fire, hydraulic, security and communications building services, who manages and delivers the integrated detailed design of multiple disciplines so as to ensure that the building is delivered in a "least cost technically acceptable" manner, with emphasis on both the construction costs and the operational costs.

Scope
Building services engineers are responsible for the design, installation, operation and monitoring of the technical services in buildings (including HVAC Engineering, mechanical, electrical, also known as MEP or HVAC), in order to ensure the safe, comfortable and environmentally friendly operation. Building services engineers work closely with other construction professionals such as architects, structural engineers and quantity surveyors. Building services engineers influence the architectural design of building, in particular facades, in relation to energy efficiency and indoor environment, and can integrate local energy production (e.g. façade-integrated photovoltaics) or community-scale energy facilities (e.g. district heating). Building services engineers therefore play an important role in the design and operation of energy-efficient buildings (including green buildings, passive houses, and Plus-houses, and Zero-energy buildings). With buildings accounting for about a third of all carbon emissions and over a half of the global electricity demand, building services engineers play an important role in the move to a low-carbon society, hence mitigate global warming.

The career path of a building services engineer can take a very wide range of directions. Within the broad field of building services engineering, new roles are emerging, for example specialization in renewable energy, sustainability, low-carbon technologies, energy management, building automation, and building information modeling (BIM). Building services engineers increasingly seek status as accredited LEED (Leadership in Energy and Environmental Design), BREEAM (BRE Environmental Assessment Method), or CIBSE Low Carbon Consultants (LCC) and Energy Assessors (LCEA) auditors, in addition to their status as chartered/professional engineer.

Building services engineering encompasses much more than just MEP or HVAC), but also the following:
 Mechanical services:
Energy supply – gas, electricity and renewable sources
 Escalators and lifts
 Heating including low-energy (low-temperature) solutions
 ventilation. This includes clean-room solutions (e.g. hospitals, labs) and industrial ventilation (factory spaces and processes)
 Air conditioning and other applications of refrigeration
 Electrical services:
 Low voltage (LV) systems, distribution boards and switchgear
 Communication lines, telephones and IT networks (ICT)
 Building automation
 Lightning protection
 Fire detection and protection
 Security and alarm systems
 Civil Engineering Public health services:
 Plumbing solutions for water supply, both potable cold water and DHW (domestic hot water),
 Drainage of waste water (sewage) from inside a building and drainage/treatment of external surface runoff around a building. Increasing use of grey-water recycling and solutions to delay runoff (e.g. green roofs and infiltration beds)
 Solutions for hygiene and sanitation, including cleaning, indoor air quality, and health technology (e.g. isolation wards)
 Other:
 Building-integrated features such as passive cooling
 Natural lighting and artificial lighting, and building facades
 Building physics, especially related to heat and moisture transfer, etc.
Design of competition and Olympic swimming pools
Design of pumping stations as well as pump houses
Integrating, restoring and designing new building services for architectural conservation projects

Examples of roles/duties a Building Services Engineer may have include:
 Consultant Civil Engineer: Designing layouts and requirements for building services for residential or commercial developments. Design management is the business side of design, which aims to create the right environment to control and support a culture of creativity and innovation, and to embrace the iterative nature of design involving the many disciplines that, collectively, will deliver design solutions – and all at the same time as ensuring that an organisation's commercial goals and objectives are achieved and that all is done in an ethically sound way. Typically the building services engineering installation is worth 30–60% of the total value of a contract. Design management is not the same as project management. Project management focuses on a wider range of administrative skills but is not normally sympathetic to the peculiarities of delivering a fully coordinated functioning design, taking into account its unique nature and dealing with the changing requirements of clients and the external factors over which there is little control.
 Contractor: Supervising the installation of the building services, commissioning systems. This includes tasks such as TABS.
 Facilities manager: Operation, servicing, and continuous commissioning of existing buildings and plant.

Professional bodies
The two most notable professional bodies are:
 The American Society of Heating, Refrigerating and Air-Conditioning Engineers (ASHRAE) was founded in 1894.
 The British Chartered Institution of Building Services Engineers (CIBSE) was founded in 1976 and received a Royal Charter in the United Kingdom, formally recognising building services engineering as a profession.

Education
Building services engineers typically possess an academic degree in civil engineering, architectural engineering, building services engineering, mechanical engineering or electrical engineering. The length of study for such a degree is usually 3–4 years for a Bachelor of Engineering (BEng) or Bachelor of Science (BSc) and 5–6 years for a Master of Engineering (MEng).

In the United Kingdom, the Chartered Institution of Building Services Engineers (CIBSE) accredits university degrees in Building Services Engineering. In the United States, ABET accredits degrees.

Building services engineering software
Many tasks in building services engineering involve the use of engineering software, for example to design/model or draw solutions. The most common types of tool are whole building energy simulation and CAD (traditionally 2D) or the increasingly popular Building Information Modeling (BIM) which is 3D. 3D BIM software can have integrated tools for Building Services calculations such sizing ventilation ducts or estimating noise levels. Another use of 3D/4D BIM is that empowers more informed decision making and better coordination between different disciplines, such as 'collision testing'.

See also

References

External links
ASHRAE American Society of Heating, Refrigerating and Air-Conditioning Engineers
BESA Building Engineering Services Association
BSRIA The Building Services Research and Information Association
CIBSE Chartered Institute of Building Services Engineers
ECA ECA - Excellence in Electrotechnical and Engineering Services
Modern Building Services journal
Online Building Services Engineering Lecture Notes
India
School of Planning and Architecture, JNA & FAU, Hyderabad, India

Building engineering
Construction
Heating, ventilation, and air conditioning